Walls (stylized as WALLS, an acronym for We Are Like Love Songs) is the seventh studio album by American rock band Kings of Leon, released on October 14, 2016, through RCA Records.

Background
Following a New Year's Eve show in Nashville, Nathan Followill said the band was aiming to release album seven in 2016: "We've already started pre-production in our studio for the next record, but the main thing on the calendar for 2016 is getting the record finished. And then the whole press machine kicks up and doing press for the record." Caleb Followill added, "We enjoy this part of the process. Obviously there's a lot of work that goes into it and it can get stressful at times, but we're all in a good place and we're having fun with it and we're all excited to do something new." The album was recorded at Henson Studios in Los Angeles, with Caleb saying the band was looking for inspiration: "We might just try to get a little change of scenery. Our first two albums we recorded in L.A., so we're going to try to go back and see if it inspires us," he said. "If it doesn't, we always have a studio at home, so we can always come back."

In August, the band announced that album title would be We Are Like Love Songs (aka WALLS), and that it would be released on October 14, 2016.

Promotion
On September 10, 2016, Kings of Leon headlined at the Saturday evening Lollapalooza Europe music festival, in Berlin, Germany, which featured songs from all their albums, plus the new "Waste a Moment". Kings of Leon performed "Waste a Moment" on Today and The Tonight Show Starring Jimmy Fallon on October 14, 2016.

The Walls Tour began on January 12, 2017.

On January 18, 2017, Kings of Leon performed "Reverend" on The Tonight Show Starring Jimmy Fallon.

Singles
The album's lead single, "Waste a Moment", was released on September 9, 2016. The song peaked at number one on Billboard's Alternative Songs chart, their first chart topper since 2010.

"Walls" was released as a single on September 23, 2016.

Kings of Leon released an official video for the track "Find Me" in December 2016 which acted as a companion clip to their video for single ‘Waste a Moment'.

The second official single, "Reverend", was sent to alternative radio on February 7, 2017. It was previously released as the album's third promotional single on October 6, 2016.

The third official single, "Around the World", was sent to alternative radio on September 19, 2017. It was previously released as the album's second promotional single on September 29, 2016.

Critical reception

Metacritic, which uses a weighted average, assigned a score of 62 out of 100 based on 23 critics, indicating "generally favorable reviews". Dave Simpson of The Guardian said that with the album, the band returned to its sound from eight years ago. Rolling Stones Will Hermes admired producer Markus Dravs's "job of translating Followill's signature sound slurred delivery and the band's muscular jangle into thicker arrangements, though the rest feel generic."

Accolades

Commercial performance
Walls debuted at number one on the Billboard 200 with 77,000 album-equivalent units, of which 68,000 were traditional album sales. The next week, the album fell from number one to 20, making it the 10th largest drop from number one on the Billboard 200 as of December 2016. It was the biggest drop of the year until Bon Jovi released This House Is Not for Sale in November 2016. It is Kings of Leon's first number one album in the US, besting the number two peak of Mechanical Bull and Come Around Sundown. It also debuted at number one in Ireland, New Zealand, and the UK.

Track listing

Personnel
Kings of Leon
 Caleb Followill – lead and backing vocals, guitar, percussion
 Matthew Followill – backing vocals, guitar, percussion
 Jared Followill – backing vocals, bass guitar, percussion
 Nathan Followill – backing vocals, drums, percussion

Additional musicians
 Liam O'Neil – background vocals, Clavinet, Jupiter-8, Mellotron, Minimoog, percussion, piano, prophet synthesizer, synthesizer, Wurlitzer

Production

 Robin Baynton – engineer
 Anthony Cairns – assistant
 Markus Dravs – producer
 Nicolas Essig – assistant engineer
 Christopher Followill – assistant
 Michael Freeman – mixing assistant
 Britti Himelfarb – assistant
 Ted Jensen – mastering
 Dylan Nelson – assistant engineer
 Brent Rawlings – assistant
 Mitch Salle – assistant
 Jay Schleusener – assistant
 Spike Stent – mixing
 Geoff Swan – mixing assistant
 Jessica Windsor – assistant

Charts

Weekly charts

Year-end charts

Certifications

References

External links
 Ultimate Guitar review

2016 albums
Albums produced by Markus Dravs
Kings of Leon albums
RCA Records albums